Fred Haslam may refer to:
 Fred Haslam (game designer)
 Fred Haslam (Quaker)
 Fred Haslam (footballer)